Tataresd is the Hungarian name for two villages in Romania:

 Tătăreşti village, Burjuc Commune, Hunedoara County
 Tătăreştii de Criş village, Vața de Jos Commune, Hunedoara County